Ventsislav Bonev (born 8 May 1980) is a Bulgarian former professional footballer who played as a defender.

He had previously played for Lokomotiv Sofia, Minyor Pernik, Marek Dupnitsa, Naftex Burgas. Bonev signed with Chernomorets Burgas in January 2009. To the end of the 2008-09 season he played in 7 matches for the club. On 20 January 2012, he was sold to Botev Plovdiv, but was subsequently released in June.

References

External links

1980 births
Living people
Bulgarian footballers
Association football defenders
First Professional Football League (Bulgaria) players
FC Lokomotiv 1929 Sofia players
PFC Lokomotiv Plovdiv players
PFC Minyor Pernik players
PFC Marek Dupnitsa players
PFC Chernomorets Burgas players
Botev Plovdiv players
FC Vitosha Bistritsa players